Telangana Bharatiya Janata Party (or BJP Telangana) is a state unit of the Bharatiya Janata Party in Telangana. The headquarters is located in Hyderabad, the capital of the state. The party appointed Bandi Sanjay Kumar as the president of the BJP Telangana and he is currently serving to this position from 2020.

History
After the formation of Telangana, BJP in alliance with Telugu Desam Party fought the 2014 Legislative Assembly election. BJP won 5 seats in the newly formed Telangana Legislative Assembly. BJP also won a Lok Sabha seat from Secunderabad constituency in the simultaneously held 2014 Lok Sabha election.

In 2018, the state assembly was dissolved earlier than its term, and elections were held same year. BJP in this election could only secure 1 seat. However in the 2019 Lok Sabha BJP won 4 out of the 17 seats. The BJP got 19.45% of the total votes.

Leadership

President

Legislative Assembly Floor Leader

Legislative Council Floor Leader

Electoral Performance

Legislative Assembly elections

Lok Sabha elections

Other

Union Ministers

Incumbent Member(s) of Parliament

Incumbent Member(s) of Legislative Assembly

See also
 Bharatiya Janata Party, Gujarat
 Bharatiya Janata Party, Uttar Pradesh
 Bharatiya Janata Party, Madhya Pradesh
 State units of the Bharatiya Janata Party

References

Telangana
Politics of Telangana